Boris Yakovlevich Zeldovich (23 April 1944 – 16 December 2018) was a Russian-American physicist and a son of the famous Soviet physicist Yakov Borisovich Zeldovich. He was doctor of the Physical and Mathematical sciences (from 1981) and a corresponding member of the Russian Academy of Sciences. Since 1994 Zeldovich worked as a professor at the College of Optics and Photonics at the University of Central Florida. During his lifetime he received a number of prestigious awards, including the USSR State Prize in 1983 and the Max Born Award in Physical Optics from the Optical Society (OSA) in 1997.

The scientific interests of Boris Zeldovich lay in the fields of non-linear optics, optical waveguide theory and optical holography. He died on 16 December 2018 at the age of 74.

References

1944 births
2018 deaths
Russian physicists
Recipients of the USSR State Prize
Corresponding Members of the Russian Academy of Sciences
Fellows of Optica (society)
Moscow State University alumni
Scientists from Moscow
Russian expatriates in the United States
University of Central Florida faculty
20th-century American physicists
20th-century Russian scientists
Soviet physicists
21st-century American physicists
American people of Belarusian-Jewish descent
Russian people of Belarusian-Jewish descent
Optical physicists
Soviet people of Jewish descent